Martina Navratilova was the defending champion.

Second-seeded Andrea Jaeger won the title, defeating top-seeded Martina Navratilova in the final 6–3, 3–6, 7–5.

Seeds
A champion seed is indicated in bold text while text in italics indicates the round in which that seed was eliminated. 

  Martina Navratilova (final)
  Andrea Jaeger (champion)
  Wendy Turnbull (second round)
  Virginia Ruzici (quarterfinals)
  Sylvia Hanika (quarterfinals)
  Virginia Wade (second round)
  Mima Jaušovec (quarterfinals)
  Terry Holladay (first round)

Draw

Final

Top half

Bottom half

References

External links
 Main draw

Virginia Slims of Kansas
1981 WTA Tour